Bombus is the genus that includes the bumblebee.

Bombus may also refer to:

 Bombus (software), instant messenger for XMPP
 Bombus (band), a Swedish speed/heavy metal band
 Bombus (album), 2010